Tracks is a 2013 Australian drama film directed by John Curran and starring Mia Wasikowska and Adam Driver. It is an adaptation of Robyn Davidson's memoir of the same name, chronicling the author's nine-month journey on camels across the Australian desert. It was shown at the 2013 Toronto International Film Festival (Special Presentation) and the 70th Venice International Film Festival 2013 (in Official Competition). It premiered in Australia as the opening film at the Adelaide Film Festival on 10 October 2013. The film has been shown at several other film festivals, including London, Vancouver, Telluride, Dubai, Sydney OpenAir, Dublin and Glasgow.

Summary
In 1977, Robyn Davidson moves to Alice Springs planning to start a cross country trip of  crossing the Australian deserts to the Indian Ocean with her dog and four dromedary camels.

For awhile Robyn works for farmers, learning the way to train camels in exchange for board and camels. A group of friends come to visit her and introduce her to National Geographic photographer Rick Smolan. When Robyn mentions that she is short of funds needed for the trip Rick suggests she write to National Geographic for funding. 

National Geographic buys the rights to Robyn's story and provides her with funding for the trip but also makes it part of the deal that Rick takes pictures for the story. Robyn finds Rick and his photographs frustrating.  

At one of the stops where Rick photographs her Robyn lashes out. They later have sex which Rick interprets as the start of a relationship while Robyn only meant is as a casual fling.

Later they encounter a group of indigenous people. Rick takes photos of a private ceremony which Robyn disapproves of. Afterwards Robyn learns her trip runs through sacred land which women are not allowed to pass through without a guide. Because of Rick's actions no one wants to help her. However while she is headed around the land Robyn encounters a group of indigenous men who, hearing of her dilemma, decide to help her. A Mr. Eddy, a respected elder, travels with Robyn as a guide and the two form a close bond with Robyn inviting him on an extra leg of her trip.

Cast
 Mia Wasikowska as Robyn Davidson
 Adam Driver as Rick Smolan
 Lily Pearl as young Robyn Davidson
 Roly Mintuma as Mr Eddy 
 Brendan Maclean as Peter
 Rainer Bock as Kurt
 Jessica Tovey as Jenny
 Emma Booth as Marg

Production
There were five attempts in the early 1980s and 1990s to adapt the book as a film. In 1993, Julia Roberts was attached to star in a planned Caravan Pictures adaptation. The project eventually fell apart. In May 2012, it was reported that Mia Wasikowska would play Robyn Davidson in a John Curran-directed adaptation. In August, Adam Driver was cast as Rick Smolan. The screenplay was written by Marion Nelson.

Finance was sourced from Screen Australia, the South Australian Film Corporation, Adelaide Film Festival, Deluxe Australia, pre-sales, and Canada's Aver Media Finance.

With a US$12 million budget, the film began shooting on 8 October 2012. It was filmed in South Australia and the Northern Territory. Julie Ryan was a co-producer.

Tracks was released to DVD and Blu-ray on 25 June 2014.

Reception

Critical response
Tracks received mainly positive reviews from critics. Review aggregator website Rotten Tomatoes gives the film a score of 82% based on 129 reviews with an average score of 7/10. The critical consensus states, "What Tracks lacks in excitement, it more than makes up with gorgeous cinematography and Mia Wasikowska's outstanding performance." The film also has a score of 78 out of 100 on Metacritic based on 34 critics, indicating "generally favorable reviews".

Leonard Maltin gave Tracks 3.5 out of 4 stars, and has stated that it is the last movie (by wide release date) that will be included in the final edition of Leonard Maltin's Movie Guide.

Word and Film rated Tracks as the best film adaptation of the year for 2014, and Sydney Arts Guide awarded Marion Nelson the Best Adapted Screenplay Award 2014.

Mandy Walker won 2014 Best Cinematography awards for Tracks from the Australian Cinematographers Society and the Film Critics Circle of Australia.

Box office
Tracks received a limited theatrical release in North America opening in four theatres and grossing $21,544, with an average of $5,386 per theatre and ranking #62 at the box office. The widest release for the film was 67 theatres, and it ultimately earned $510,007 in North America and $4,368,235 internationally, a total of $5,853,509.

Accolades

References

External links 
 

2013 films
2010s adventure drama films
2013 biographical drama films
Australian adventure drama films
Australian biographical drama films
Films set in deserts
Films set in Australia
Films shot in Flinders Ranges
Films directed by John Curran
Films set in 1977
2013 drama films
Films based on autobiographies
2010s English-language films
Screen Australia films
See-Saw Films films
Transmission Films films